Alejandro Patiño is an American actor.

He has guest starred on several television programs including the recurring role of Ralph, Gabrielle Solis's new gardener, on the ABC series Desperate Housewives. Other appearances include House, Roswell, It's Always Sunny in Philadelphia, Arrested Development and Family Law.

From 2013 to 2014, Patino costarred as Cesar on the FX series The Bridge. He has starred as Ernesto in the independent film Papi Chulo and as the cantina bartender in the Coen brothers’ The Ballad of Buster Scruggs.

He has portrayed Bossman in the live comedy production Chico's Angels, a parody of the 1976–81 TV series Charlie's Angels, since 2003.

As of late 2015 and up until 2016, Patino has been appearing in Popeyes Louisiana Kitchen commercials in U.S. Hispanic market media.

Personal life
Patino was born in Santa Maria, California.

Filmography

References

External links
 

American male film actors
American male television actors
Year of birth missing (living people)
Living people